The Home Maker is a 1925 American silent drama film directed by King Baggot and starring Alice Joyce, Clive Brook, and Billy Kent Schaefer. A husband and wife are more successful once they have swapped roles.

Plot
As described in a film magazine review, a man who is conscientious but inefficient in business is married to a woman who does not care for home work because she has great business ability. He attempts suicide because of his repeated failures, but injures himself by paralyzing his lower limbs and becoming an invalid. Thereafter he stays at home with the children and writes, while his wife takes a business position. Both are so happy with their changed circumstances that, when the husband discovers he can use his limbs again, he begs the family doctor not to reveal the fact, lest the happiness of the family be ruined. The doctor accedes, and the family’s bliss continues.

Cast

Preservation status
A print of The Home Maker is preserved in the UCLA Film and Television Archive.

References

Bibliography
  Richard Koszarski. An Evening's Entertainment: The Age of the Silent Feature Picture, 1915-1928. University of California Press, 1994.

External links

Lobby cards and stills at the Alice Joyce website

1925 films
1925 drama films
Silent American drama films
Films directed by King Baggot
American silent feature films
1920s English-language films
Universal Pictures films
American black-and-white films
Surviving American silent films
1920s American films